The Glory of Youth  is the first Chinese Army Rocket Force television series based on Feng Jie's novel Graduated, Being A Soldier developed by The Chinese People's Liberation Army Rocket Force, Starring Li Yifeng, Chen Xingxu, Zhang Xinyu and Xiao Yang. It aired on Zhejiang TV, Jiangsu TV and Youku from 13 April to 11 May 2021. And a special edited version (VIP Exclusive version) aired on Youku (VIP members) on May 20, 2021

Synopsis
A story about "Xia Zhuo" (Li Yifeng), a top-class college student, who won the world college student super brain competition but was framed; his roommate and rival "Ouyang Jun" (Chen Xingxu) was also disqualified from his degree for cheating; and Xia Zhuo's 2 buddies, "Lin Anbang" (Duan Bowen), and "Yi Zimeng" (Dong Chunhui). Chose to join the army and become soldiers for the rocket force. The four walked into the Rocket Army's ace troop-270 brigade. The brigade commander "An Lei" (Yu Bo) is determined to form a highly maneuverable troop, "Warblade Company". Mobilized the best recruits with the best veterans, the four elders of the 270 brigade "Lang Yongcheng" (Xiao Yang), "Chen Haofeng" (Jiang Tong), "Wang Xianmin" (Fan Lei), "Hou Jidong" (Chunyu Shanshan) to join this experimental troop. The changes between veterans and recruits are slowly taking place in the troop. The fusion between them has made this troop the whetstone of the entire Rocket Army. Under the leadership and inspiration of veterans with unique skills, this group of Rocket Army recruits experienced both physical and mental tempering, and eventually grew and transformed into the "Ace Trumpeter" of the Chinese Rocket Army.

Cast

Main

Li Yifeng as Xia Zhuo
 A genius, who has both IQ and honor. Born in an intellectual family. Joining the Rockets Army after seeing a missile launch. His appearance made the leader a headache, he could always raise questions about anything. During his service in the military, he used his wisdom and perseverance to complete many difficult tasks. Under the influence of the troops and comrades, he gradually found his life goal: to become a real soldier.

Chen Xingxu as Ouyang Jun
 A lone wolf. He was Xia Zhuo's classmate, but they have never been friends. His degree was canceled due to his cheating on exams, so he joins the army. The only goal is to go to the military academy to be promoted. Under the care of army veterans, Xia Zhuo, and others, he gradually transformed into an outstanding rocket army that values comradeship.

Zhang Xinyu as Huang Wen
 The Rocket Army's psychologist

Xiao Yang as Lang Yongcheng
 Squad leader, specialized in driving an army truck rocket launcher

Duan Bowen as Lin Anbang
 Xia Zhuo's best friend, fun-loving

Dong Chunhui as Yi Zimeng
 Xia Zhuo's best friend, sloppy king, dream to be a singer

Supporting

Wang Daqi as Lu Zheng  (Company commander)
Yu Bo as An Lei  (270 Brigade commander)
Jiang Tong as Chen Haofeng
Fan Lei as Wang Xianmin
Chunyu Shanshan as Hou Jidong
Zhang Ruonan as Liang Nuo  (Xia Zhuo's girlfriend)
Zheng Xiaoning as Liang Kewen
Sang Mingsheng as Shao Shuai (Instructor)
Zhu Lingwu as Yan Yibing (Hygienist)
Zhang Shen as Huang Li (The chief designer of DF-185 missile)
Yu Xiaoming as Yang Wanjin
Yu Zhen as Yu Quanhai
Gao Jin as Qi Peng (Battalion commander)
Du Yuan as Fan Chao
Wen Zhengrong as Li Manwen  (Xia Zhuo's mother)
Zhao Yansong as Xia Weilin  (Xia Zhuo's father)
Zheng Yu as Ouyang Hua  (Ouyang Jun's father)
Deng Sha as Teacher Zhou (An Lei's wife)
Wang Yingxin as An Lei's daughter
Cao Xuheng as Qiao Dawei
Lu Yan as Wang Tian
Shi Zhaoqi as Fang Zhenjun
Zhang Zhengyang as Wang Jinying
Na Jiawei as Zhuo Wukui
Dong Yanlin as Wang Guangwu
Ni Min as Kou Xiangrui
Wang Zepei as Chen Jialiang
Li Mingxuan as He Lei
Du Juan as Zuo Li
Qiao Shengyi as Liu Ji
Mu Dong as Li Mang
Kang Lei as Qin Li

Production
The overall production process of the play requires live shooting in a large number of military facilities. For this reason, the crew took several months to build a military defense center in the Dongfang Sunac Film Metropolis.
On October 7, 2019, Filming was started in Qingdao and was finished in Jiangshan, Zhejiang on January 20, 2020

The television version weight on the military parts from the beginning. And there was an urgent edit before the broadcast, cause some parts of the story missing. So there's a special version that was later released on Youku.

Soundtrack

Broadcasts outside China 
The series was picked up by RTHK in Hong Kong, as part of the new Chinese TV series strand on RTHK TV 31 in a bid to instill patriotism in Hong Kong people.

References

Chinese television series
Chinese military television series
2021 Chinese television series debuts
Television shows based on Chinese novels
Mandarin-language television shows
Youku original programming